Marin Plamenov Petkov (born 2 October 2003) is a Bulgarian footballer who plays mainly as a winger and attacking midfielder for Bulgarian First League club Levski Sofia. А versatile player, he can also be deployed as a wing-back and centre-forward.

Career
Petkov is a youth exponent from Levski Sofia. He signed his first professional contract with the club on 11 January 2020.

International career
On 5 September 2022, Petkov received his first call-up for the senior Bulgaria national team for the UEFA Nations League games against Gibraltar and North Macedonia on 23 and 26 September 2022. Petkov made his debut in the match against Gibraltar and scored the last goal in a 5–1 win by Bulgaria.

Career statistics

Club

International

Scores and results list Bulgaria's goal tally first.

Honours

Club
Levski Sofia
 Bulgarian Cup (1): 2021–22

References

External links
 
 Profile at LevskiSofia.info
 Profile at Levski Academy

Living people
2003 births
Bulgarian footballers
Association football midfielders
PFC Levski Sofia players